Shireen Bailey ( Hassan; born 27 September 1959) is an English former middle distance runner who competed in the 800 metres and the 1500 metres. She represented Great Britain in both events at the 1988 Olympic Games in Seoul. In 1983, she became only the second British woman in history to run the 800 metres in under two minutes. She is also a former English national record holder at the distance.

Career
Bailey was born in Kensington, London, England. She was a member of the Bromley Athletics Club (now Blackheath and Bromley). She competed at the 1982 Commonwealth Games in Brisbane, finishing fifth in the final of the 800 metres in 2:02.41.

In 1983, Bailey was the UK's top ranked woman at 800 metres. In May, she won the UK Championships title in 2:01.36, ahead of Lorraine Baker. In July, she won the AAA Championships title in 2:00.58, ahead of Anne Purvis and Christina Boxer. Then on 23 August in Oslo, she ran a personal best of 1:59.54. This made her only the second British woman in history to run under the two-minute barrier for 800 metres. The first being Christina Boxer in 1979. Bailey was the UK's second fastest 800m woman for the next four seasons, behind Lorraine Baker (1984/86) and Kirsty Wade (1985/87). In 1984, her season's best was 2:00.44, but she failed to earn selection for the Los Angeles Olympic Games. She returned to sub two-minute form in 1985, improving her personal best to 1:59.36.

After a slow start to the 1986 season, missing out on Commonwealth Games selection, she improved in the second half of the season, earning selection for the European Championships in Stuttgart, where she ran 2:00.41 in the heats. In the semi-final, she ran 2:00.50 to narrowly miss the final. She achieved her season's best in September, running 1:59.85. In 1987, Bailey had another slow start to the season and missed World Championships selection. She once again found her best form in September. On 11 September, she finished third in the IAAF Grand Prix Final in Brussels, behind Ana Quirot and Slobadanka Colovic. Then on 15 September in Lausanne, she reached her peak at 800 metres, running 1:58.97, to set a new English national record. The previous mark was Christina Boxer's 1:59.05 from 1979. The UK record was held by the Scottish born Welsh athlete Kirsty Wade, with 1:57.42. Bailey's record would stand for almost three years, until Diane Edwards ran 1:58.65 in 1990.

At the 1988 AAAs Championships, incorporating the Olympic Trials, Bailey earned selection at both 800 metres and 1500 metres. With the first two in each event guaranteed a place on the team, she secured her place by finishing second to Kirsty Wade in the 800 metres in 2:02.49, before going on to finish second to Christina Cahill (Boxer) in the 1500 metres in 4:09.20. At the Olympic Games in Seoul, South Korea she reached the 800 m semi-finals, running 1:59.94, before reaching the final of the 1500 metres, running a lifetime best of 4:02.32 for seventh, ahead of Mary Slaney and Doina Melinte, who were eighth and ninth respectively. The Seoul Olympics, would prove to be the highlight of Bailey's career. She did earn selection for the 1990 Commonwealth Games in Auckland, where she finished eighth in the 1500 metres final in 4:13.31.

As of 2018, Bailey's 800 metres best of 1.58.97, ranks 11th on the UK all-time list. Her 1500 metres best of 4:02.32, ranks her 16th. She also ranks fifth on the UK all-time list at 1000 metres with 2:35.32.

Competition record

Personal bests
600 metres — 1:26.8 (1985)
800 metres — 1:58.97 (1987)
1000 metres — 2:35.32 (1986) 
1500 metres — 4:02.32 (1988) 
Mile — 4:31.45 (1989)

References

External links

1959 births
Living people
English female middle-distance runners
Olympic athletes of Great Britain
Athletes (track and field) at the 1988 Summer Olympics
Commonwealth Games competitors for England
Athletes (track and field) at the 1982 Commonwealth Games
Athletes (track and field) at the 1990 Commonwealth Games